Modern historians agree that Rajputs consisted of a mix of various different social groups and different varnas. Rajputisation (or Rajputization) explains the process by which such diverse communities coalesced into the Rajput community.

Formation

According to modern scholars, almost all Rajputs clans originated from peasant or pastoral communities. Rajputisation is the study of formation of the community over the centuries.

Sivaji Koyal suggests that Rajputisation boosted Brahmanism and defines it as follows,

Sociologists like Sarah Farris and Reinhard Bendix state that the original Kshatriyas in the northwest who existed until Mauryan times in tiny kingdoms were an extremely cultured, educated and intellectual group who were a challenge to monopoly of the Brahmins. According to Max Weber, ancient texts show they were not subordinate to the Brahmins in religious matters. These old Kshatriyas were undermined not only by the Brahmin priests of the time but were replaced by the rise of the new community of illiterate mercenaries in the north-west - the Rajputs. Since the Rajputs were generally illiterate unlike the Kshatriyas, their rise did not present a challenge to monopoly of the Brahmins.

Anyone from the "village landlord" to the "newly wealthy lower caste Shudra" could employ Brahmins to retrospectively fabricate a genealogy and within a couple of generations they would gain acceptance as Hindu Rajputs. This process would get mirrored by communities in north India. Scholars refer to this as "Rajputisation" and consider it similar to Sanskritisation. This process of generation of the Rajput community resulted in hypergamy as well as female infanticide that was common in Hindu Rajput clans. German historian Hermann Kulke has coined the term "Secondary Rajputisation" for describing the process of members of a tribe trying to re-associate themselves with their former tribal chiefs who had already transformed themselves into Rajputs via Rajputisation and thus claim to be Rajputs themselves.

Stewart N. Gordon states that during the era of the Mughal empire, "Hypergamous marriage" with the combination of service in the state army was another way a tribal family could convert to Rajput. This process required a change in tradition, dressing, ending widow remarriage, etc. Such marriage of a tribal family with an acknowledged but possibly poor Rajput family would ultimately enable the non-Rajput family to become Rajput. This marriage pattern also supports the fact that Rajput was an "open caste category" available to those who served in the state army and could translate this service into grants and power at the local level.

Scholars also give some examples of entire communities of Shudra origin "becoming" Rajput even as late as the 20th century.
William Rowe, in his "The new Chauhans : A caste mobility movement in North India", discusses an example of a large section of a Shudra caste - the Noniyas - from Madhya Pradesh, Uttar Pradesh and Bihar that had "become" Chauhan Rajputs over three generations in the Raj era. The more wealthy or advanced Noniyas started by forming the Sri Rajput Pacharni Sabha (Rajput Advancement Society) in 1898 and emulating the Rajput lifestyle. They also started wearing of Sacred thread. Rowe states that at a historic meeting of the caste in 1936, every child this Noniya section knew about their Rajput heritage.

A caste of shepherds who were formerly Shudras successfully changed their status to Rajput in the Raj era and started wearing the Saced thread. They are now known as Sagar Rajputs.(not to be confused with Sagar Rajputs of Bundelkhand which was a subclan of Bundela Rajputs and are considered to be the highest among all central India Rajputs).

The terminology "Rajput" as of now doesn't represent a hereditary status but it is a term commonly applied to all those people who fought on the horseback and were associated with paid military service. The Rajputs of Rajasthan have often refused to acknowledge the warriors from the eastern part of the country as the Rajputs. These western Rajputs restricted their social contact with the people of variety of ethnic and cultural backgrounds, who claimed Rajput status by following intermarriages between themselves and preserving their "purity of blood".Hence many Rajputs of Rajasthan are nostalgic about their past and keenly conscious of their genealogy, emphasising a Rajput ethos that is martial in spirit, with a fierce pride in lineage and tradition.
However, by the 17th century, the Ujjainiya Rajput clan of Bihar was recognised as Parmar Rajputs by the Rajputs of Rajasthan and were allowed a place in the Rajasthani bardic khyat.

Dirk H. A. Kolff thus describes the Rajputs of Bihar, Awadh and Varanasi with the terminology "Rajput" or "Pseudo Rajput". These Rajputs or the eastern Rajput often accompanied the Rajput of Rajasthan in their battles with the hordes of their supporters. They led the band of warriors called Purbiyas in order to assist their western counterparts but were notorious for frequently changing their allegiance as Silhadi did in the Battle against Babur, when he deserted Rana Sanga in the Battle of Khanwa leading to defeat of Rajput contingents and consolidation of Mughal empire in India.

Steps in Rajputisation process
In general, the process of Rajputisation was done not just by a tribal chief but by "castes all over north India ranging from peasants and lower-caste Sudras", as well as warriors and even the "local raja who had recently converted to Islam".

Sivaji Koyal has explained the Rajputisation of a tribal chief by dividing it in 7 successional steps.

Rajputisation used to begin with an invitation by a "budding tribal Raja" to the Brahmins in order to seek their assistance in the establishment of a court for him, for which the Brahmins would receive "land and gifts". Later, the Brahmins would "somehow" discover that the tribal head is a Rajput and "his lineage was traced back to some important kshatriya dynasty of the past". After his proclamation as a Rajput, he would distance himself from the members of his tribe as they were supposedly of different bloodlines. Following that, he would raise his stature by hiring Brahmins as priests who used to appeal for the construction of temples in the honor of their gods.

In the next step, after amassing political and economic power, the Raja would establish "marriage alliances" with other Rajputs to infuse "Rajput blood into his family". This was followed by the springing up of sub–chiefs who used to follow suit of the "behavioral pattern of their king–master". The final step involved the inter–marriage between the nobles and the "lesser sons and daughters" of the Raja.

Sivaji Koyal is of the opinion that by the process of Rajputisation, the Huns were the first to receive proclamation as kshatriyas in India who were later on followed by Rajputana's Scythians, Gurjaras, and Maitrakas. Rajputisation of ruling group of a tribe who had formerly disassociated with the tribe and become Rajput was followed by a process called "Secondary Rajputisation" where the former members of the tribe would try to re-associate with their former chief and this claim to be Rajputs themselves. Rajputisation is said to have no parallel in traditional Indian society for "inventiveness in ideologies of legitimation".

Differences between Sanskritisation and Rajputisation

Attempted Rajputisation of Adivasi people

Bhangya Bhukya notes that during the final years of the British Raj, while education introduced Westernisation in the hilly areas of central India, the regions also parallelly underwent the Hinduisation and Rajputisation processes. The Gond people and their chiefs started doing the "caste–Hindu practices" and frequently claimed the "Rajput, and thus kshatriya status". The British empire used to support these claims as they viewed the adivasi society to be less civilized than the caste society and believed that adivasi peoples' association with the castes would make the adivasis "more civilized and sober" and "easier for the colonial state to control". Bhukya also points out that central India's "Raj Gond families" had already adopted the religious and social traditions of the Rajputs before the British Raj in India, and there were "matrimonial relations" between a number of Gond and Rajput Rajas. However, the British empire's policies of offering "zamindari rights, village headships and patelships" fueled the process.

According to Patit Paban Mishra, "the 'ksatriyaisation' of tribal rulers and their surroundings, resulted in the Hinduisation of tribal areas".

Rajputization of Uttarakhand groups

Researchers give examples of the Rajputs of both division of present-day Uttarakhand–Garhwal and Kumaon and show how they were formally Shudra but had successfully converted to Rajput at different times. These Rajput groups(khasa) of Kumaon, Uttarakhand today were formally classified Shudra but had successfully converted to Rajput status during the rule of Chand Rajas (that ended in 1790). Similarly, the Rajputs of Gharwal were originally of low ritual status and did not wear the sacred thread until the 20th century.

Attempted Rajputisation of Darogas
The Darogas formed a community and started calling themselves Ravana Rajputs in order to Rajputize. They are a group who are believed to be the progeny of Rajput kings with their concubines and were most often called as Daroga. Lindsey Harlan gives an example of how children born from Rajput men and Gujjar women would not become Rajputs and would become Darogas.

Attempted Rajputisation of Jats
The Sikh adoption of the Rajput surnames Singh and Kanwar/Kaur was an attempt by the Sikhs to Rajputise their identity, this form of Rajputisation was more specifically done for the Jat  Sikhs who were considered to be of low origin amongst the Sikhs. The Phulkian Jats, who originally gained power by helping the Mughal Emperor Babur enter India, continued to Rajputise their identity till the 20th century by remotely claiming descent from the Bhati Rajputs of Jaisalmer. Similarly the Jats of Bharatpur and Dholpur also tried to Rajputise their origin. Bharatpur reportedly lost its Rajput status when their ancestor Balchand was unable to have children with his Rajput wife and had sons with a Jat woman.
The British-era ethnographer Denzil Ibbetson noted that “Rajput” in the Punjab region of what is now Pakistan, was used as a title rather than as a “ethnological fact” with tribes like Jats being able to gain the Rajput title after rising to royal rank.

Attempted Rajputisation of Yadavs
Many groups adopted the Yadav surname for upliftment, these groups were mainly cowherders and were low in the caste order but were considered higher than the untouchables. In 1931 several communities like Ahir, Goala, Gopa, etc. Started calling themselves Yadavs and made extremely doubtful claims about having Rajput origin and thus tried to Rajputise.According to R. C. Dhere, Shivaji's clan of Bhonsles are descendants of Hoysalas and Seuna Yadavas, who were cow-herding pastoralists. As per Dhere, first cousin (on mother's side) of Seuna Yadava king Singhana I moved to Satara from north Karnataka in the first half of the 13th century. This cousin was "Baliyeppā Gopati Śirsāṭ", also known as Balip, who was a Hoysala. Dhere claims that Shivaji is a descendant of Balip. His middle name Gopati means "Lord of the Cows" and he moved north with a considerable herd of cattle. He was born in Soratpur in 1190, a place where both Seunas and Hoysalas fought a decisive battle. He belonged to the Gavli community and worshipped deity Shambhu Mahadev, a local form of Shiva who is the Kuladevata of Bhonsle family. He settled down in Shinganapur where he established a shrine for his deity, dated by scholars between 1250 and 1350, which coincides with the reign of Singhana I. However, the earliest known Bhonsle Kheloji, great-grandfather of Maloji, does not have genealogical records that connect him to Balip, a 250 years of missing link. But, there is a branch of Bhonsle clan extant in Maharashtra that goes by the name "Śirsāṭ Bhosale". Dhere argues that the name Bhosale is linguistically descended from Hoysala. Shambhu Mahadev is a god of Dhangars and Gavlis. Shivaji's first official expedition after his consecration was to a number of religious sites including Shambhu Mahadev temple at Shinganapur. The resting places of Shahaji, Shivaji and Sambhaji are right next to this temple. Many communities in India went through the process of occupational change from pastoralism to settled agriculture in the transition from medieval time to modernity. This is also seen in the Rajputization process of tribal communities.

Attempted Rajputisation of Kolis 
Records of Koli people exist from at least the 15th century, when rulers in the present-day Gujarat region called their chieftains marauding robbers, dacoits, and pirates. Over a period of several centuries, some of them were able to establish petty chiefdoms throughout the region, mostly comprising just a single village. Although not Rajputs, this relatively small elite subset of the Kolis claimed the status of the higher-ranked Rajput community, adopting their clan names, lineages, customs and intermixing with less significant Rajput families through the practice of hypergamous marriage, which was commonly used to enhance or secure social status. There were significant differences in status throughout the Koli community, however, and little cohesion either geographically or in terms of communal norms, such as the establishment of endogamous marriage groups. The Kolis also employed Barots to fabricate a genealogy which would state the Kolis were of partial Rajput origin.

Rajputisation of Jadejas
According to the sociologist Lyla Mehta, the Jadeja were Hindu descendants of a Muslim tribe that had migrated from Sindh to Kutch. They originated from pastoral communities and laid a claim on the Rajput identity after marriages with Sodha Rajput women.Gujarat's Jadeja Rajputs were called "half-Muslim" and they employed Muslim African Siddi slaves for cooking.

Rajputisation in Pakistan
The British-era ethnographer Denzil Ibbetson noted that “Rajput” in the Punjab region of what is now Pakistan, was used as a title rather than as a “ethnological fact” with tribes like Jats being able to gain the Rajput title after rising to royal rank.

See also
 Acculturation
 Bhats

References

Bibliography

 
 
 
 
 
 
 
 

Cultural assimilation
Caste system in India
Social change
Rajput culture